Vaillant was a 64-gun ship of the line of the French Navy, designed by Noël Pomet, and lead ship of her class.

Career 

In 1772, she was under La Brizollière, and bound for Saint Domingue, along with Actionnaire, Aurore and Sylphide. The year after, she was at Toulon under Oppède.

In 1777, she was under Chabert-Cogolin in Estaing's fleet. On 14 August 1778, along with Hector, she captured the 8-gun bomb vessel HMS Thunder at Sandy Hook. She took part in the Battle of Grenada on 6 July 1779. She returned to Lorient that same year. In November, she was part of a division off Savannah, along with Zélé and Marseillais, when the ships got separated.

In 1780, Seillans took command of Vaillant. The year after, she was under Bernard de Marigny.

In 1782, Sainte-Eulalie took command and sailed her back to France.

Fate 
Vaillant was hulked in Rochefort in 1783. From 1792, she was used as a masting crane.

Notes, citations, and references 
Notes

Citations

Bibliography
 
 
 

External links
 

Ships of the line of the French Navy
1756 ships
Vaillant-class ships of the line